Jacques Hippolyte Aristide Farrenc (9 April 1794 – 31 January 1865) was a French flautist, musicologist and music publisher.

Biography 
Aristide Farrenc worked as a flautist at the Théâtre italien and founded the Éditions Farrenc, a music publishing company which he left in 1841 to devote himself to musicology.

In collaboration with his wife Louise Farrenc, he published the Trésor des pianistes in 20 issues (1861–1872), containing many works of early music for harpsichord (Couperin, Bach, Haendel, Scarlatti, Rameau,  etc.), and sonatas for pianoforte such as those by CPE Bach, Haydn, Mozart, Clementi, Hummel, Dussek, Weber, Beethoven, and Chopin. Eight of these issues were their joint work; the remainder were published by Louise after her husband's death.

His wife Louise Farrenc was a virtuoso pianist, esteemed teacher and composer. After his death in 1865 she continued to publish the Trésor des pianistes until the 20th and last volume in 1872. Three additional volumes also appeared, but containing the music already published of the first half of the nineteenth century (Hummel, Ries, Weber, Mendelssohn and Chopin).

Works 
 Les Concerts historiques de M. Fétis à Paris, Paris, 1855.
 Le Trésor des pianistes, Paris, 1861; New York, 1977.

References

External links 
 , including the complete series Le Trésor des Pianistes.
 Aristide Farrenc on MusOpen
 Aristide Farrenc on idref.fr

French classical flautists
French music publishers (people)
19th-century French musicologists
1794 births
Musicians from Marseille
1865 deaths
19th-century classical musicians
19th-century musicologists